DeWall is a surname of Anglo-Saxon origin, derived from the baptismal name "Joel". Notable people with the surname include:

Caleb DeWall (born 1979), better known as Silas Young, American professional wrestler
Kevin DeWall (born 1977), American football coach
Richard DeWall (1926-2016), American cardiothoracic surgeon